Ana Ipătescu (1805–1875) was a Romanian revolutionary who participated in the Wallachian Revolution of 1848.

Biography 
Ana was born in Bucharest, in the Olarilor slum, in the family of a merchant, Atanasie Ghiulerasă, from the incipient bourgeoisie at the end of the Phanariot period.
In 1828 she married the tenant Ivancea Dimitrie, from whom she divorced in 1831 (1931), in the same year  her father died. Due to this situation she had an arranged marriage with  Nicolae Ipătescu. Thanks to her husband, a clerk in the Treasury Department, she attended meetings of the Brotherhood secret society, where she met some of the leaders who would enter the revolutionary government after the revolution broke out on June 9, 1848. She participated directly in the revolution and led the pro-revolutionary crowds, and was arrested on June 19, 1848 because of a counter-revolutionary conspiracy.

She died in 1875. Although she had wanted to be buried at Pasărea Monastery, her grave could not be identified until now.

An important boulevard in Bucharest was named after Ipătescu under the communist regime. Shortly after the Romanian Revolution, its previous name of Lascăr Catargiu was restored, although Ipătescu had no ties to communism.

Notes

References
 George Marcu (coord.), Dicţionarul personalităţilor feminine din România, Editura Meronia, București, 2009, p. 140 
 Stan Stoica, Vasile Mărculeţ, George Marcu ş.a., Dicţionar biografic de istorie a României, Editura Meronia, București, 2008, p. 291 

1805 births
1875 deaths
People from Bucharest
19th-century Romanian people
People of the Revolutions of 1848
Romanian revolutionaries